Colin MacDonald may refer to:

Colin MacGilp MacDonald, British historian and author
Colin MacDonald (writer), Scottish writer
Colin MacDonald (musician) (born 1978), lead singer of The Trews
Colin MacDonald (politician) (1890–1975), Australian politician
Colin Macdonald, founder of FRED (disk magazine)

See also
Colin McDonald (disambiguation)
Augustine Colin Macdonald (1837–1919), Canadian merchant and politician